Rath is a surname. Notable people with the surname include:

Alan Rath (born 1959), American electronic, kinetic, and robotic sculptor
Ari Rath (1925–2017), Austrian-Israeli journalist and write
Biswa Kalyan Rath Indian stand-up comic and fabulous writer
Billy Rath (1948–2014), American musician
Bogdan Rath (born 1972), Romanian and later Italian Olympic water polo player 
Claudia Rath (born 1986), German heptathlon athlete
Daniela Rath (born 1977), German high jumper
David Rath (born 1965), former Minister of Health for the Czech Republic
Edward C. Rath (died 1969), first County Executive of Erie County, New York
Elfriede Moser-Rath (1926–1993), Austrian ethnologist
Ernst vom Rath (1909–1938), German diplomat killed in Paris
Fred Rath, Sr. (born 1943), American baseball pitcher 
Fred Rath, Jr. (born 1973), American baseball pitcher, son of Fred Rath, Sr.
Fred J. Rath (1888–1968), New York state senator
Gerhard vom Rath (1830–1888), German mineralogist
Gary Rath (born 1973), American left-handed baseball pitcher 
Goodly Rath, Indian film composer, musician, singer
Henry Coyle Rath (1898–1918), World War I flying ace credited with twelve aerial victories
Lukas Rath (born 1992), Austrian association football player
Mac Rath, nickname of Giric (c.832–889), king of the Picts or of Alba
Marcel Rath (born 1975), German football player
Marius Rath (born 1970), Norwegian Olympic ice hockey player
Mary Lou Rath, American politician, state senator in New York
Matthias Rath (born 1955), controversial German physician and vitamin entrepreneur
Meaghan Rath (born 1986), Canadian film and television actress
Morrie Rath (Maurice Rath) (1886–1945), American second base baseball player
Rachel Rath (born 1976), Irish actress
Ramakanta Rath (born 1934), Indian poet, wrote in the Oriya language
Spyros Rath (died 1983), Greek politician, mayor of Corfu
Srinivas Rath, Indian poet and professor of literature, wrote in Sanskrit
Thomas Rath (born 1970), German football (soccer) midfielder 
Thomas D. Rath, American lawyer, former Attorney General of New Hampshire
Tom Rath, American author 
Ulrik Rath (born 1946), Danish chess master
Walther vom Rath (1857-1940), German, scientist, entrepreneur and politician
Wilhelm von Rath (1585–1641), Saxon cavalry officer
Wilhelm Rath (1897-1973), German writer and anthroposophist

See also
Rath (Oriya surname)
Vom Rath